Walter Sutcliffe (born 1976) is a British opera and theatre director.

His work has been seen in the UK, US, Germany, Austria, The Czech Republic, Italy, France and Estonia, including productions of Christopher Fry's The Lady's Not for Burning, Strindberg's The Great Highway and the Austrian premiere of Michael Tippett's The Knot Garden for the Klangbogen Festival in Vienna. He directed the American stage premiere of Leoš Janáček's first opera, Sarka, for Dicapo Opera, New York. In 2017 his new productions include Rigoletto in Santiago, Chile, Manon Lescaut in Osnabruck, and Eugen d'Albert's Tiefland in Toulouse.

At the Bockenheimer Depot for Frankfurt Opera, he directed the first production in Germany of Benjamin Britten's opera Owen Wingrave in January 2010, and of Aribert Reimann's Gespenstersonate in January 2014. Also in Frankfurt he staged Antonio Cesti's L'Orontea in February 2015. He has directed among other works, such as Mozart's Don Giovanni and Offenbach's Orpheus in the Underworld for the opera in Osnabrück, Verdi's Luisa Miller and La Traviata in Braunschweig, Werther and Kiss Me Kate in Magdeburg, Le Grand Macabre and Der Zwerg in Chemnitz, Cosi fan tutte and Carmen in Tallinn, Estonia, Otello in Turin, Owen Wingrave and The Turn of the Screw in Toulouse, and Albert Herring in Linz.

Sutcliffe studied the bassoon at the Royal College of Music as well as history at Cambridge. His opera background might partly be attributed to the fact that his parents are the opera critic Tom Sutcliffe and the playwright and librettist Meredith Oakes.

References 
Emma Pomfrett, interview with Sutcliffe, Opera Now magazine, Nov/Dec 2008

External links
Walter Sutcliffe's official website

1976 births
Living people
British opera directors
British theatre directors